Kevin Luarca (born December 10, 1993) is a former soccer player. Born in Venezuela, he represented Canada internationally.

Career
Luarca played with the Montreal Impact Academy in the Canadian Soccer League from 2011 to 2013. He also played in the Premier Development League for Montreal Impact U23.

On March 13, 2015, it was announced that Luarca would join FC Montreal, a USL affiliate club of the Montreal Impact for their inaugural season.  He made his professional debut for the club on March 28 in a 2–0 defeat to Toronto FC II.

References

External links

1993 births
Living people
Canadian soccer players
Canada men's youth international soccer players
Venezuelan footballers
Canadian people of Venezuelan descent
Venezuelan emigrants to Canada
Montreal Impact U23 players
FC Montreal players
Association football midfielders
USL League Two players
USL Championship players
Première ligue de soccer du Québec players
Canadian Soccer League (1998–present) players
FC Lanaudière players